Madonna English School, is a co-Educational ICSE private secondary school at Kathalbari and another branches at Laheriasarai and Allalpatti in Darbhanga state of Bihar. Madonna English School is affiliated with the Council for the Indian School Certificate Examinations, based in New Delhi. It offers courses up to class 10th.

History
The school was started by Swami Muttu /S..M Michael on 12 January 1977 in Alalpatti, darbhanga with 65 students. There were five teachers. The classes ran from L.K.G. to 3rd standard. The school provided conveyance facility to its students through hired autos. The first school day function was on 8 December 1977.

In the year following the inception, the number of pupils went up to 270 and classes ran from L.K.G. till fifth standard. By the third year of its running, the school had 300 plus students and classes till seventh standard. By the fifth year, class eighth had been added.

In ten years since 1977, Madonna had above 650 students. The school started taking admission on the basis of tests conducted. The teaching faculty consisted of teachers from various states. In those days the other schools in Darbhanga had timings of 9 am to 4 pm. Madonna brought a change by introducing early morning timings of classes from 7 am to 12 pm.
Madonna also holds the distinction of being the first school in district to introduce computer education in school curriculum. The school started with three and then five computers in an air conditioned computer laboratory.

History

A new branch was proposed in kathalbari, darbhanga. The land was bought in 1997 and the foundation stone was laid on 1 January 1998. By September, the ground floor was finished, and classes were commenced soon after.
Madonna applied for an affiliation to ICSE board in 1999, and following an inspection by the board in 1999, affiliation was granted to the school in 2000. In April 2000, the ninth standard was started. Two years later, in 2002, with just twelve students, the first batch of Madonna appeared in ICSE tenth board examinations. The second appearing batch had 20 students, and the third, 30.

Present day

Today, Madonna has four branches in Darbhanga, with a student capacity of more than 3000 students. The school has more than 50 plus computers, science labs and a library. In 2012 60 Students appeared in the board exams of Std. 10th.

Infrastructure
Madonna English School have three branches: Kathalwari, Allalpatti and laheriasarai. The Kathalwari branch has four buildings: the Main School for Senior Classes, Madonna Pre-Primary, Madonna Junior and St. Francis Hostel (boarding).

References

See also
 Darbhanga

Education in Darbhanga
Schools in Bihar
1977 establishments in Bihar
Educational institutions established in 1977